This is a list of airlines operating in Cook Islands.

Current airlines

Defunct airlines

References 

Lists of airlines by dependent territory

Airlines
Lists of airlines of Oceania
Lists of defunct airlines
Airlines